is the 30th single by Japanese singer/songwriter Chisato Moritaka. Written by Moritaka and Hiromasa Ijichi, the single was released by One Up Music on November 11, 1996. The song was used for TV commercials promoting Meiji's Melty Kiss chocolate.

Chart performance 
"Gin'iro no Yume" peaked at No. 9 on Oricon's singles chart and sold 236,000 copies. It was certified Gold by the RIAJ.

Other versions 
Moritaka re-recorded the song and uploaded the video on her YouTube channel on January 9, 2013. This version is also included in Moritaka's 2013 self-covers DVD album Love Vol. 3.

Track listing 
All lyrics are written by Chisato Moritaka; all music is arranged by Yuichi Takahashi.

Personnel 
 Chisato Moritaka – vocals, drums, piano
 Yasuaki Maejima – piano, Fender Rhodes, percussion
 Yuichi Takahashi – guitar, keyboard
 Yukio Seto – bass
 Shin Hashimoto – Taishōgoto
 Masafumi Yokoyama – bass

Chart positions

Certification

References

External links 
 
 
 

1996 singles
1996 songs
Japanese-language songs
Chisato Moritaka songs
Songs with lyrics by Chisato Moritaka
Songs with music by Hiromasa Ijichi
One Up Music singles